MW3 may refer to:
Call of Duty: Modern Warfare 3, a 2011 video game
MechWarrior 3, a 1999 video game

See also
 3MW (disambiguation)